John Delabere (before 1559 – 1607), of the Middle Temple, London and Southam, Gloucestershire, was an English politician.

He was a Member (MP) of the Parliament of England for Devizes in 1589.

References

1607 deaths
People from the Borough of Tewkesbury
English MPs 1589
Year of birth uncertain